Bellunese Institution to study and preserve the Ladin culture in 35 municipalities of Agordino, Cadore, Comelico and Zoldo.

External links 
  "Istituto Ladin de la Dolomites" in Belluno
  "Istitut Ladin Micurà de Rü" in South Tyrol

Ladin language
Cultural organisations based in Italy